Abacetus auratus is a species of ground beetle in the subfamily Pterostichinae. It was described by Straneo in 1949 and is an endemic species found in the Central African Republic.

References

Endemic fauna of the Central African Republic
auratus
Beetles described in 1949
Insects of Central Africa